Palmetto Estuary Preserve (or Palmetto Estuary Park) is a  preserve in Palmetto, Florida. The preserve is located directly north of the Hernando de Soto Bridge and abuts the Manatee River.

Overview 
The City of Palmetto acquired the land as part of a land swap in the 1990s for the construction of Riviera Dunes, located on the eastern side of US 41 / US 301. The ecological restoration of the area was done by Ecosphere Restoration Institute, a Tampa-based nonprofit organization. The project was the first public-private habitat restoration in the Tampa Bay region and awarded Environmental Project of the Year by the Tampa Bay Regional Planning Council in 2002.

A  solar canopy was constructed at its northern parking lot in 2016 as a partnership between Florida Power & Light and the City of Palmetto.

References

External links 
Palmetto Estuary Preserve at Florida Communities Trust Parks Directory

Nature reserves in Florida
Protected areas of Manatee County, Florida
Parks in Manatee County, Florida
1998 establishments in Florida